The minister of finance is the minister of the Crown in the Canadian Cabinet who is responsible for overseeing the Department of Finance and presenting the federal government's budget each year. It is one of the most important positions in the Cabinet.

Chrystia Freeland is the 40th and current finance minister, assuming the role in August 2020 following the resignation of Bill Morneau. She concurrently is the deputy prime minister of Canada. 

Because of the prominence and responsibility of this cabinet position, it is not uncommon for former ministers of finance to later become prime minister. Charles Tupper, R. B. Bennett, John Turner, Jean Chrétien, and Paul Martin all became prime minister after previously serving as minister of finance.

Responsibilities

In addition to being the head of the Department of Finance, the minister of finance is also the minister responsible for:

Bank of Canada
Canada Deposit Insurance Corporation
Canada Development Investment Corporation
Canada Pension Plan Investment Board
Canadian International Trade Tribunal
Office of the Superintendent of Financial Institutions
Financial Transactions and Reports Analysis Centre of Canada
Mission to the International Monetary Fund (serving as "Governor" voter)
Serving as a permanent member of the Treasury Board of Canada

List of ministers
Key:

References

External links
Department of Finance Canada 

Finance
Department of Finance (Canada)